Daniel Demetrio Hernández (born July 23, 1976 in Tyler, Texas) is an American former soccer player.

Career

Youth and college
Hernández was a student at John Tyler High School and played youth soccer for the Dallas Texans Soccer Club.  He played college soccer and college football as a placekicker at Southern Methodist University from 1994 to 1997, where he was a First Team All-American as an attacking midfielder.

Professional
Upon graduating from SMU, Hernández was drafted in the second round of the 1998 MLS College Draft by the Los Angeles Galaxy of Major League Soccer. He saw little playing time in the Galaxy, appearing mostly a substitute, before being traded to the Tampa Bay Mutiny in exchange for Jorge Salcedo. Hernández hardly played for the Mutiny either, appearing in only four games, and was traded the next year to the MetroStars for the rights to Daniel Alvarez.

With the MetroStars, Hernández finally came into his own, earning a starting position, first in central defense, and then becoming one of the league's most dangerous defensive midfielders. He stayed with the MetroStars from 2000 to 2002, but was a part of a blockbuster trade in the middle of 2002, which sent him along with Brian Kamler and Diego Serna to the New England Revolution for Mamadou Diallo, Andy Williams, and Ted Chronopoulos. Despite being a starter for the Revolution, Hernández expressed displeasure with his situation, requesting a trade to his home state Dallas Burn. The Burn, however, were unwilling to make such a trade, and upon the emergence of an adequate replacement for him in Shalrie Joseph, Hernández was transferred to Mexican club Necaxa mid-season 2003. In six seasons in MLS, he totalled four goals and 15 assists in league play.

To the surprise of many, Hernández – called Demetrio in Mexico – earned a starting position as a central defender on the club. According to Hernández, his profile in his hometown of Tyler has increased enormously since his arrival in the Primera División. However, in 2005, he came back to MLS, re-signing with New England. In 2007, he was waived by the Revolution.

After brief stints back in Mexico with Puebla and Chiapas F.C. in 2007 and 2008, Hernández signed with FC Dallas in September 2009. With Dallas, Hernandez has been a key player playing as the team's primary defensive midfielder. Following the 2011 season, Hernández signed an extension with the club that saw him also become an assistant coach as part of a transition out of his playing career.

Hernández announced his retirement from playing professional soccer on November 21, 2012.

Coaching
Upon retiring as a player, it was announced Hernández would have a full-time coaching role, also with FC Dallas. However, just a few weeks after being hired Hernández was fired from his coaching job with FC Dallas.

Honors

Los Angeles Galaxy
Major League Soccer Supporters' Shield (1): 1998

MetroStars
Major League Soccer Eastern Conference Championship (1): 2000

New England Revolution
Major League Soccer Eastern Conference Championship (3): 2002, 2005, 2006

FC Dallas
Major League Soccer Western Conference Championship (1): 2010

References

External links
 
 
 

1976 births
Living people
American sportspeople of Mexican descent
Sportspeople from Tyler, Texas
Soccer players from Texas
American soccer players
Association football defenders
SMU Mustangs men's soccer players
LA Galaxy draft picks
LA Galaxy players
Tampa Bay Mutiny players
New York Red Bulls players
New England Revolution players
Chiapas F.C. footballers
Club Necaxa footballers
Club Puebla players
FC Dallas players
Major League Soccer players
Liga MX players
All-American men's college soccer players
Major League Soccer All-Stars
American expatriate soccer players
American expatriate sportspeople in Mexico
Expatriate footballers in Mexico
Players of American football from Texas
American football placekickers
Footballers who switched code
SMU Mustangs football players